McPhearson is a surname. Notable people with the surname include:

Gerrick McPhearson (born 1983), American football player
Zech McPhearson (born 1998), American football player

See also
McPherson